Dorota Gruca, married Giezek (born 5 December 1970 in Tarnogród) is a Polish marathon runner, who is a three-time national champion in the women's 5.000 metres.

She finished thirteenth at the 2005 World Championships, in a career best time of 2:27:46 hours. She also competed at the World Half Marathon Championships in 1995, 1996, 1998, 2000 and 2008

Achievements
All results regarding marathon, unless stated otherwise

See also
Polish records in athletics

References

marathoninfo

1970 births
Living people
Polish female long-distance runners
Athletes (track and field) at the 2008 Summer Olympics
Olympic athletes of Poland
People from Biłgoraj County
Sportspeople from Lublin Voivodeship
Polish female marathon runners
Olympic female marathon runners
20th-century Polish women
21st-century Polish women